Johann "Hans" Hölzel (19 February 1957 – 6 February 1998), better known by his stage name Falco, was an Austrian singer and musician. He had several international hits including "Der Kommissar" (1981), "Rock Me Amadeus",  "Vienna Calling", "Jeanny", "The Sound of Musik", "Coming Home (Jeanny Part II, One Year Later)", and posthumously "Out of the Dark". 

"Rock Me Amadeus" reached No. 1 on the Billboard charts in 1986, making Falco the only artist in history whose principal language was German, to score a vocal number-one hit in the United States. According to his estate, he has sold 20 million albums and 40 million singles, which makes him the best-selling Austrian singer of all time.

Also notable was his very early creation of a successful non-English language rap music song (Der Kommissar), recorded in December 1981.

Early years
Johann Hölzel was born on 19 February 1957 to Alois Hölzel and Maria Hölzel in a working class district of Vienna. Maria would later recall that she had been pregnant with triplets. As it was a dizygotic pregnancy, she miscarried the identical twins during the third month and Falco, who was conceived via a separate ovum, survived. Falco mused that "three souls in one breast sounds a little over-dramatic, but I do sense them sometimes. In my moodiness. I'll be really up and then right after I'll be really down."

In 1963, Falco began his schooling at a Roman Catholic private school; four years later, at age ten, he switched to the Rainergymnasium in Margareten. Falco's father left the family while he was still a child, and he was raised by his mother.

Falco began to show signs of unusual musical talent very early. As a toddler, he was able to keep time with the drumbeat in songs he heard on the radio. He was given a child's grand piano for his fourth birthday; a year later, his birthday gift was a record player which he used to play music by Elvis Presley, Cliff Richard, and the Beatles.

Falco wanted to be a pop star from a very early age. At age 16, he attended the Vienna Conservatoire, but he  became frustrated and soon left. His mother insisted he begin an apprenticeship with the Austrian employee pension insurance institute. This too only lasted a short time. At seventeen, he got conscripted for eight months of military service with the Austrian army.

In late 1970s Vienna, he became part of the Viennese nightlife, which included not just music but also striptease, performance art and a general atmosphere of satirizing politics and celebrating chaos. He played bass guitar in a number of bands under various pseudonyms, including "John Hudson" and "John DiFalco." One such band with whom he appeared was Drahdiwaberl, an Austrian group that employed shock tactics and stage antics. It was around this time he began performing under the stage name of Falco. Despite being closely tied with the Viennese underground club scene, Falco looked uncharacteristically clean-cut. In contrast to shabbier fashions, he had short hair (due to his military service) and wore Ray-Ban sunglasses and suits. His distinct style, coupled with his singing performance of the song "Ganz Wien" ("All of Vienna") led to manager Markus Spiegel offering to sign Falco in 1981. Ironically, it was at a concert for drug prevention and "Ganz Wien" has a line proclaiming "All Vienna is on heroin today."

Individual success 

Once Falco was signed as a solo artist, he continued composing his own music and hired songwriter Robert Ponger. In 1981 Falco brought his intended first single "Helden von heute" to manager Horst Bork, but received a lukewarm reception. Bork felt that the B-side "Der Kommissar" was much stronger. Falco was hesitant, since the track is a German-language song about drug consumption that combines rap verses with a sung chorus. Though beginning to break through in America, rap was still rare in Western Europe at the time. Bork insisted and the song became a number-one success in Germany, France, Italy, Spain and Japan, while charting high in several other nations.

Though "Der Kommissar" failed to break through in the UK and US, the British rock band After the Fire covered the song with new English lyrics. This version charted at number five on the Billboard Hot 100 in the U.S. That same year, American singer Laura Branigan recorded a non-single version of the song with new English lyrics under the title "Deep in the Dark" on her album Branigan 2. Einzelhaft, the album on which "Der Kommissar" appears, also topped the charts in Austria and the Netherlands.

Falco and Ponger returned to the studio in 1983 to record Falco's second album Junge Roemer ("Young Romans"). It was a difficult project, as the two artists felt immense pressure to match their previous success and the recording process was plagued by delays. Junge Roemer was released in 1984. Even though the music video for the single "Hoch wie nie" ("Higher Than Ever") was aired on prime time TV in Austria, it failed to ignite interest internationally.

Junge Roemer only charted in Austria where it went to number one. Outside of Austria and Spain, the title track and main single "Junge Roemer" failed to repeat the success of "Der Kommissar". As a reaction, Falco began to experiment with English lyrics in an effort to broaden his appeal. He parted ways with Ponger and chose a new production team: the brothers Rob and Ferdi Bolland from the Netherlands.

Falco recorded "Rock Me Amadeus" inspired in part by the Oscar-winning film Amadeus, and the song became a worldwide hit in 1986. It reached No. 1 in over a dozen countries, including the US, UK, and Japan, bringing the success that had eluded him in markets a few years earlier. The song remained in the top spot of the Billboard Hot 100 for three weeks. His album Falco 3 peaked at the number three position on the Billboard album charts. Unusually for a white act, especially one from mainland Europe, "Rock Me Amadeus" reached number six in the Billboard Top R&B Singles Chart, and Falco 3 peaked at number 18 on the Top R&B/Hip-Hop Albums charts. Follow-up single "Vienna Calling" was another international pop hit, peaking at No. 18 of the Billboard Charts and No. 17 on the US Cash Box Charts in 1986. A double A-side 12" single featuring remixes of those two hits peaked at No. 4 on the US Dance/Disco charts.

"Jeanny", the third release from the album Falco 3, brought the performer back to the top of the charts across Europe. Highly controversial when it was released in Germany and the Netherlands, the story of "Jeanny" was told from the point of view of a possible rapist and murderer. Several DJs and radio stations refused to play the ballad, which was ignored in the US, though it became a huge hit in many European countries, and inspired a sequel on his next album.

After the success of "Rock Me Amadeus," there were talks of crossing over more permanently into the U.S. by working with American producers and collaborating with other American artists. These possibilities fell through, in part, due to Falco's personal problems. At this point in his career, he was dangerously addicted to alcohol and other drugs.

In 1986, the album Emotional was released, produced by Rob and Ferdi Bolland (Bolland & Bolland). Songs on the album included "Coming Home (Jeanny Part II, One Year Later)", "The Kiss of Kathleen Turner", and "Kamikaze Capa" which was written as a tribute to the late photojournalist Robert Capa. "The Sound of Musik" was another international success, and a Top 20 US dance hit, though it failed to make the US pop charts.

After 1986, there were a number of European hits, but Falco was rarely heard in the US and the UK.

In 1987, Falco went on the Emotional world tour ending in Japan.  In the same year he sang a duet with Brigitte Nielsen, "Body Next to Body"; the single was a Top 10 hit in German-speaking countries. The album Wiener Blut ("Viennese Blood") was released in 1988 but it did not get much publicity outside Germany and Austria.

His 1992 comeback attempt, the album Nachtflug ("Night Flight") including the song "Titanic", was successful in Austria only.

Starting in the early 1990s, Falco lived in the Dominican Republic, where he worked on his last album from 1995 to 1998. Out of the Dark (Into the Light) was released posthumously on 27 February 1998 in Europe and worldwide in March. It charted at number one in Austria for 21 weeks.

Personal life
Falco has been described by those who knew him as having a complex personality. He has been called ambitious, eccentric, caring, egotistical and deeply insecure. Thomas Rabitsch, a keyboardist who met Falco when the aspiring pop star was only 17 years old, said he was a quiet young man and precise bass player, but also arrogant and with a "very high opinion of himself." Markus Spiegel, the manager who discovered Falco, admitted that the pop star was "an extremely difficult artist" and known womanizer. Peter Vieweger, a guitarist who knew Falco before his success and continued to play in Falco's touring band and on his albums, remembers Falco as being "scared he would fail or be unmasked and not be as good as people thought he was."

Through the 1980s and into the '90s, he became dependent on alcohol and cocaine. When under the influence he was unreliable at best and abusive at worst. Ferdi Bolland recalls that Falco was often so severely intoxicated that the writing process revolved around his "inability to be coherent, to even stand for a long time." Despite pleas from his manager and collaborators to get help, Falco stubbornly refused.

While Falco was in a relationship with Isabella Vitkovic, she gave birth to a baby girl, Katharina, in 1986. The couple married in 1988, but it was a "love-hate" relationship, as Katharina describes it, and the marriage was short-lived. He believed that Katharina was his own daughter until a paternity test proved otherwise when she was seven years old. After this, Katharina's relationship with him became strained. Though they kept in contact, she took her mother's surname and claimed that she was written out of his will. She was 12 years old when he died. She did not reconcile with Falco's mother, Maria Hölzel, until a few years before Hölzel's death at the age of 87 in April 2014. Katharina subsequently published a memoir in 2008 called Falco war mein Vater (Falco Was My Father).

Death and tributes

Falco died of severe injuries received on 6 February 1998, 13 days before his 41st birthday, when his Mitsubishi Pajero collided with a bus on the road linking the towns of Villa Montellano and Puerto Plata in the Dominican Republic. At the time of his death he was planning a comeback, which was successful with the posthumously released album Out of the Dark (Into the Light). His body was returned to Austria and buried at the Vienna Central Cemetery.
In 1998, Rob and Ferdi Bolland (Dutch producers and co-writers of about half of Falco's albums) released the EP Tribute to Falco under the name The Bolland Project feat. Alida. The title track featured samples of Falco's music; the other tracks were "We Say Goodbye" and "So Lonely".

The film Falco: Damn It, We're Still Alive! was released in Austria on 7 February 2008, ten years and one day after Falco's death.  This title also lends its name to a posthumously-released album by Falco, Verdammt wir leben noch, which translates to "Damn, we're still alive!"  Written and directed by Thomas Roth, the movie features musician Manuel Rubey as adult Falco.  The end credits include the line "With love, Ferdi & Rob", his frequent collaborators the Bollands.

Falco's friend Niki Lauda named one of the Boeing airplanes in his Lauda Air fleet "Falco" after the singer.

Although "Der Kommissar" saw nearly contemporaneous and fairly straightforward mainstream covers including the loose translation by After the Fire and the reinterpretation by Suzy Andrews, both in 1982 and 1983, Falco's song "Rock Me Amadeus" has seen more frequent use. Megaherz covered this song on their album Kopfschuss. The track has been sampled by groups including the Bloodhound Gang, who also refer to Falco in their 1999 song "Mope", and by German rapper Fler in "NDW 2005" from Neue Deutsche Welle.

The restaurant Marchfelderhof in a Vienna suburb maintains a permanent reserved table for Falco.

The 1999 film Sugar Town is dedicated to Falco.

Discography

Studio albums
 Einzelhaft (1982)
 Junge Roemer (1984)
 Falco 3 (1985)
 Emotional (1986)
 Wiener Blut (1988)
 Data de Groove (1990)
 Nachtflug (1992)
 Out of the Dark (Into the Light) (1998)
 Verdammt wir leben noch (1999)
 The Spirit Never Dies (2009)

Notes

References

Further reading

External links

  – official site (in German)
 Official Falco – promotional site by Sony BMG
 
 
 

 
1957 births
1998 deaths
A&M Records artists
Austrian bass guitarists
20th-century Austrian male singers
Austrian new wave musicians
Austrian pop singers
Austrian rappers
Austrian soldiers
Burials at the Vienna Central Cemetery
Dance musicians
English-language singers from Austria
Hansa Records artists
Male bass guitarists
Road incident deaths in the Dominican Republic
Sire Records artists
20th-century guitarists
20th-century bass guitarists